Eslamabad (also Romanized as Eslāmābād) is a village in Safayyeh Rural District, in the Central District of Najafabad County, Isfahan Province, Iran. At the 2006 census, its population was 872, in 237 families.

References 

Populated places in Najafabad County